Schistocerca alutacea, the leather-colored bird grasshopper, is a species of grasshopper in the family Acrididae. The species occurs in the United States, from Massachusetts to Arizona and Florida.

References

Acrididae
Insects described in 1841
Orthoptera of North America